Indirect presidential elections were held in Israel on 10 June 2014. The result was a victory for Reuven Rivlin of the Likud party. Rivlin was sworn in as President of Israel on 24 July.

Background
In November 2013, Attorney General Yehuda Weinstein ruled that candidates for the office of President would be barred from raising funds to finance their campaigns.

In January 2014, incumbent President Shimon Peres announced that he would not run for a second term, despite an opinion poll showing 63% of Israelis would prefer him to remain in office. A second term would require change in legislation, as the Basic Law on the presidency permits only one term, following reforms made after the 1998 presidential election to prevent an incumbent being challenged for the presidency.

Candidates
In 2012, an agreement was made between Knesset Speaker Reuven Rivlin and Prime Minister Benjamin Netanyahu that Rivlin would be the party's candidate for the election if Likud won the 2013 Knesset election. Likud subsequently emerged with a parliamentary plurality. However, in February 2014 The Jerusalem Post reported that both Netanyahu and Avigdor Lieberman, a major power in the Likud party, had a poor relationship with Rivlin and had not ruled out backing another candidate. 

In February 2014, Binyamin Ben-Eliezer of the Labor Party became the first candidate to receive the required 10 nominations from Knesset members. Four days before the election, Ben-Eliezer was investigated by the police on corruption charges and subsequently withdrew from the race.

Other candidates included Nobel Prize laureate Dan Shechtman, Meir Sheetrit of Hatnuah, Dalia Itzik of Kadima, and former Supreme Court judge Dalia Dorner. Potential candidates who expressed an interest in running but did not receive the written support from ten members of the Knesset needed for nomination included Uzi Landau of Yisrael Beiteinu, Silvan Shalom of Likud, and businessman Yosef Abramowitz.

Opinion polls
Although the public were not able to vote in the election, opinion polls were conducted to determine public support for the candidates.

Results

Only 119 votes were cast, as one member of the Knesset, Meir Porush, was abroad.

References

Presidential elections in Israel
President
Israel